Imperial Treasury may refer to:
Imperial treasury, Istanbul (Hazine-i Âmire), the crown jewels and other treasures of the Ottoman Empire
Imperial treasury, Moscow (Императорская сокровищница), the crown jewels and regalia of the Russian Empire
Imperial treasury, Rome (fiscus), the personal wealth of the Roman emperor.
Imperial Treasury, Vienna (Schatzkammer), the crown jewels and regalia of the Holy Roman Empire